Hetemaj is a surname. Notable people with the surname include:

Mehmet Hetemaj (born 1987), Albanian footballer
Përparim Hetemaj (born 1986), Finnish footballer